Réjean Hébert is a Canadian politician and geriatrician. He was a member of the National Assembly of Quebec for the riding of Saint-François, first elected in the 2012 election, he served as Minister of Health and Social Services in the government of Pauline Marois.

His narrow victory over Quebec Liberal Party candidate Nathalie Goguen was confirmed in a judicial recount on September 14, 2012. He was defeated in the 2014 Quebec election by Liberal candidate Guy Hardy.

Hebert was dean of the School of Public Health at the Universite de Montreal.

In September 2019, Hébert was confirmed as the federal Liberal Party of Canada candidate in the Longueuil—Saint-Hubert electoral district. He won the nomination by acclamation, but did not win the election.

Hébert was married and had children before coming out as gay at age 40. He was one of three openly gay members of the National Assembly during his time in office, alongside Sylvain Gaudreault and Agnès Maltais.

Electoral record

Federal

Provincial

|}

|-
 
|Liberal
|Monique Gagnon-Tremblay
|align="right"|13,327
|align="right"|46.96
|align="right"|+9.10

|Independent
|François Mailly
|align="right"|210
|align="right"|0.74
|align="right"|
|}

References

1955 births
21st-century Canadian politicians
French Quebecers
Living people
Parti Québécois MNAs
Politicians from Quebec City
Gay politicians
Canadian LGBT people in provincial and territorial legislatures
Health ministers of Quebec
Liberal Party of Canada candidates for the Canadian House of Commons
Canadian geriatricians
21st-century Canadian LGBT people
Canadian gay men